Alaattin Çakıcı (born 20 January 1953) is a former member of the ultra-nationalist Grey Wolves in Turkey, and one of the leading figures of the Turkish mafia.

In service of MİT 

Mehmet Eymür, a leading official of the Turkish National Intelligence Organization (MİT) disclosed that he was the first person to employ Alaattin Çakıcı for covert operations of the MİT. Yavuz Ataç, an operations official, confirmed that he was introduced to Alaattin Çakıcı two months later he joined the MİT in May 1987 as the manager of the security department. Ataç says "Çakıcı has been a fugitive, sought for six or seven crimes at the time he first met him". According to Ataç, Çakıcı was assigned to operations outside of Turkey.

As determined by the security forces, Çakıcı was in 1995 on the assassination list of Dev Sol, a Marxist–Leninist organization.

Second marriage 

In 1991, Çakıcı made his second marriage with Nuriye Uğur Kılıç, the daughter of Dündar Kılıç, a mob boss of the Turkish underworld the "godfather of godfathers". However, he and his father-in-law fell out following the chain of incidents known as the "Civangate ". In November 1994, the couple divorced. He contracted the killing of his ex-wife Uğur Kılıç and his ex-henchman Nurullah Tevfik Ağansoy. On 20 January 1995, she was shot dead with seven bullets fired by the hitman Abdurrahman Keskin in front of her son Onur in Uludağ, a ski resort in Bursa. It was on Çakıcı's birthday.

Political ties and scandals 
Çakıcı contracted the assassination of Cavit Çağlar, a wealthy businesspeople from Bursa and a high-level politician and government minister, and Mehmet Üstünkaya, former president of Beşiktaş J.K., in relation with the incidents known as the "Türkbank scandal", in connection with the privatization of Türk Ticaret Bankası to Korkmaz Yiğit. The plot was uncovered by the police at the preparation stage. He has close ties to Devlet Bahçeli, the president of the far-right political party MHP who visited him in prison and who in 2018  demanded a general amnesty for certain prisoners, naming Çakıcı personally. The demand was denied by the government, though.

Abroad (1992–1998) 
Çakıcı fled abroad in 1992 with the help of a fake passport. It was determined that he toured in Belgium, United States, Italy, South Africa, France, Brazil, Singapore and Japan. He is held responsible for the murder of 41 people.

Arrest in France (1998) 
Informed by the Turkish police, French police apprehended him on 17 August 1998 in a hotel in Nice, France together with his bodyguard Muradi Güler and his courier Aslı Fatoş Ural, daughter of composer Selçuk Ural. He had been carrying a fake diplomatic passport (red passport) on the name of "Nedim Caner" and US$17,000 cash with him.

His capture revealed his connections not only to the intelligence service people but also to high-level politicians. Recording tapes published after his capture in 1998 in France led to the resignation of the government minister from the Motherland Party (ANAP) Eyüp Aşık, who was accused of warning Çakıcı to flee. Meral Akşener, minister of interior from the True Path Party (DYP), MİT agent Yavuz Ataç and businesspeople Erol Evcil were also accused of the same allegation. After 16 months of isolated incarceration in France, he was returned to Turkey of his own will on 14 December 1999. He was imprisoned in Kartal Prison in Istanbul. Following controversies with rival gang member inmates, he was transferred to the maximum-security Kandıra prison in Kocaeli.

In June 2000 he was sentenced to five years for running a criminal gang.

Abroad (2003–2004)
Çakıcı was released from the prison on 1 December 2002. Although not allowed to leave Turkey and his passport confiscated, he fled from Antalya to Greece by sea as told by a group of people, including his nephew and Erol Evcil, who were apprehended by the police in Foça, İzmir. Çakıcı had obtained a passport with false identity and photograph from the police in Ümraniye, Istanbul.

Arrest in Austria (2004) 
Çakıcı stayed four-and-a-half months in Paris and Strasbourg in France as observed by the Turkish police. In order to visit Ali Çakıcı, his son from the first marriage, in a hospital in Graz, he drove to Austria changing three times his car underway. His intention was to pass later to Italy to join his girlfriend Aslı Fatoş Ural. Austrian police, informed by the Turkish police, apprehended Çakıcı on 14 July 2004 out of Graz. He had been carrying a Turkish special passport (green passport) issued on the name Faik Meral, a retired MİT agent, and its expiration extended from the police in İzmir. He had EUR 4,000 in cash with him. Visas in his passport showed that he traveled first to Russia and then entered Germany, where he stayed a while before going to France.

On 14 October 2004, Çakıcı was deported from Austria at the request of the Turkish Ministry of Justice. He was brought from Vienna to Istanbul in a commercial airliner escorted by five policemen. After trial, he was imprisoned in the maximum-security prison in Tekirdağ.

Trials (2004–present) 
After his return to Turkey, Çakıcı was put on trial, and found guilty of the following crimes:

 Three years and four months' imprisonment for his contract to shoot the renowned journalist Hıncal Uluç, as he had written a newspaper column about him and his wife Uğur Kılıç he was about to divorce.
 Three years and four months' imprisonment for organized crime in relation with the gunned assault on 26 March 2000 to the club local of Fatih Karagümrük S.K. in Istanbul.
 Nineteen years and two months' imprisonment for his contract to murder his ex-wife.
 Ten years and ten months' imprisonment for the gunned assault at the speculator Adil Öngen's car.

Release 
On 15 April 2020, he was released after the Turkish parliament approved a law to contain the spread of the COVID-19 in the prisons.

References

External links
 Turkish Daily News, 27 September 1998, Cakici's Cabinet

1953 births
Living people
Grey Wolves (organization) members
People convicted of murder by Turkey
People extradited to Turkey
People from Arsin, Turkey
Turkish crime bosses
Turkish nationalists
Turkish people convicted of murder